The Racta is a left tributary of the river Tur in Romania. It discharges into the Tur in Turulung.

References

Rivers of Romania
Rivers of Satu Mare County